Timothy Douglas Harford  (born 27 September 1973) is an English economic journalist who lives in Oxford. 

Harford is the author of four economics books and writes his long-running Financial Times column, "The Undercover Economist", syndicated in Slate magazine, which explores the economic ideas behind everyday experiences. His column in the Financial Times, "Since You Asked", ran between 2011 and 2014 and offered a sceptical look at the news of the week.

Since October 2007 Harford has presented the BBC Radio 4 programme More or Less. The series segments are also available as podcasts. Subsequently Harford launched his own podcast on the podcast production network Pushkin Industries, called Cautionary Tales.

Education
Harford was educated at Aylesbury Grammar School and then at Brasenose College, Oxford. He obtained a Bachelor of Arts degree in Philosophy, Politics and Economics and then a Master of Philosophy in Economics, in 1998. Harford said that he originally planned to drop economics when studying towards his undergraduate degree but that his Economics tutor Peter J. N. Sinclair convinced him otherwise.

Personal life
He lives in Oxford with his wife Fran Monks, a photographer, and their three children.

Career
Harford joined the Financial Times in 2003 on a fellowship in commemoration of business columnist Peter Martin. He continued to write his financial column after joining International Finance Corporation in 2004, and he rejoined the Financial Times as economics lead writer in April 2006. He is also a member of the newspaper's editorial board.

Tim has spoken at TED, PopTech and the Sydney Opera House. He is a visiting fellow at Nuffield College, Oxford and an honorary fellow of the Royal Statistical Society.

In August 2007, he presented a television series on the BBC, Trust Me, I'm an Economist. In October 2007, Harford replaced Andrew Dilnot on the BBC Radio 4 series More or Less. From November 2016, he presented an economic history documentary radio and podcast series 50 Things That Made the Modern Economy. Since November 2019, he has been presenting the podcast series Cautionary Tales. On 13 November 2020 he started a new podcast series on COVID-19 Vaccination called How to Vaccinate the World.

Harford is managed by the agency Knight Ayton.

Awards
 More or Less won the Royal Statistical Society's 2010 award for statistical excellence in broadcast journalism. In 2017 Harford was made an Honorary Fellow of the society.
 More or Less won Mensa's award for promoting intelligence in public life.
 Harford was awarded the Bastiat Prize for economic journalism in 2007 (shared with Jamie Whyte). In 2010 he again drew with Whyte, in second place.
 He was awarded the OBE in the 2019 New Year Honours for services to Improving Economic Understanding

Publications
 The Market for Aid (2005) with Michael Klein, 
 The Undercover Economist (2005), 
 The Logic of Life (2008), 
 Dear Undercover Economist: Priceless Advice on Money, Work, Sex, Kids, and Life's Other Challenges (2009). New York, Random House. 2009. 
 Adapt: Why Success Always Starts with Failure (2011). New York, Farrar, Straus and Giroux. 
 The Undercover Economist Strikes Back: How to Runor Ruinan Economy (2014). Penguin Riverhead Books (US). 
 Messy: The Power of Disorder to Transform Our Lives (2016). Riverhead Books. 
 Fifty Things That Made the Modern Economy (2017). Little, Brown. 
 The Next Fifty Things that Made the Modern Economy (2020). The Bridge Street Press. 
 How to Make the World Add Up: Ten Rules for Thinking Differently About Numbers (2020). Little, Brown. 
 Published in North America as: The Data Detective: Ten Easy Rules to Make Sense of Statistics (2021). Riverhead Books.

References

External links
 Harford's column at the Financial Times with RSS Feed
 All is fair in love and war and poker – details of the first episode of "Trust me, I'm an economist" (BBC)
 Blog at the FT, which began October 2007
 Video (and audio) of interview of Tim Harford by Will Wilkinson on Bloggingheads.tv
 
 An interview with Tim Harford about The Logic of Life on The Marketplace of Ideas
 
 A series of short film commentaries by Tim Harford on the work of past Nobel Laureates in economics, as part of the Nobel Perspectives project

1973 births
Living people
English economists
English male journalists
Alumni of Brasenose College, Oxford
Bastiat Prize winners
Fellows of Nuffield College, Oxford
Financial Times people
People educated at Aylesbury Grammar School
Officers of the Order of the British Empire
Fellows of the Royal Statistical Society
21st-century British economists
21st-century English male writers
21st-century British journalists